Loxodactylus is a genus of beetles in the family Carabidae, containing the following species:

 Loxodactylus australiensis Sloane, 1895
 Loxodactylus carinulatus (Chaudoir, 1865)

References

Pterostichinae